Radio Exterior de España (REE) or simply Radio Exterior is a Spanish free-to-air radio station owned and operated by Radio Nacional de España (RNE), the radio division of state-owned public broadcaster Radiotelevisión Española (RTVE). It is the corporation's international radio service, it was launched on 15 March 1942, and is considered to be Spain's equivalent to the BBC World Service, Deutsche Welle and Radio Canada International.

History
While the first shortwave broadcasts to Europe (La Voz de España) were brought forward by RNE already in 1942, its current branding (Radio Exterior de España) was adopted on 2 January 1978.

Broadcasting
The station is primarily intended for Spaniards living abroad. It broadcasts 24-hours a day on satellite and the internet but for limited hours on shortwave. Transmissions are in Spanish, French, Arabic, Ladino, Portuguese, Russian and English.

REE ceased shortwave broadcasts on 15 October 2014; however, two months later it was announced they would resume shortwave broadcasts in Spanish for four hours a day, as well as coverage of sporting events, in order to serve the country's fishing industry whose ships had no other viable means to access REE broadcasts while at sea.

REE transmission originate from the Noblejas transmission site.

Programs
24 hours, evening information and entertainment program, with news on politics, culture, economy and sport.
Radiogaceta de los deportes, sports information program, commentary and commentary on the matches of the Spanish championship of football, basketball and other sports such as Formula 1 and MotoGP.
Españoles en la mar, program aimed mainly at sailors.
Amigos de la onda corta, program aimed at radio amateurs and dxers.

Former logos

See also
 List of shortwave radio broadcasters
 List of international radio broadcasters

References

External links 

 
English language broadcast of REE
REE World Wide Frequency

RTVE
Radio stations in Spain
International broadcasters
Radio stations established in 1978